Sithu Min Oo (– in or after 1370s) was a longtime pretender to the Pinya throne from the 1320s to the 1360s. After Ava replaced Pinya as the new power in present-day central Myanmar in 1365, Sithu entered into an alliance with King Swa Saw Ke of Ava by marrying Swa's daughter Minkhaung Medaw. Kings Mingyi Nyo, Tabinshwehti and Nanda of the Toungoo dynasty were descended from him.

Brief
Sithu Min Oo was the elder of the two children of Princess Atula Maha Dhamma Dewi and Crown Prince Uzana I of Pinya. In 1325, by primogeniture, he technically became the heir presumptive when his father ascended to the Pinya throne. However, Sithu probably was never officially recognized as the heir apparent throughout his father's much contested reign. The de facto heir apparent, according to the royal chronicles, was Uzana's half-brother Prince Kyawswa, who maintained his own army and conducted his own policy. Nor was Sithu viewed as a potential successor by his own father, who relied much more on the younger son Thihapate Min Htwe. Whereas the king appointed Htwe governor of Yamethin, and gave command of a regiment (1000 troops, 800 cavalry and 60 war elephants), chronicles do not report any appointments whatsoever for Sithu.

Perhaps because of his low profile, Sithu managed to survive the subsequent palace intrigues to the 1360s. He was not purged when Kyawswa consolidated the power in the early 1340s. (Kyawswa viewed Thihapate Min Htwe, who seriously considered a rebellion, as a threat.) While Thihapate is not heard from again after 1351, Sithu lived through the fall of Pinya in 1364, and the rise of the new kingdom at Ava (Inwa) in 1365. He was apparently still viewed as an eminence grise then. Swa Saw Ke, who became king of Ava 1367, gave his teenage daughter Minkhaung Medaw in a marriage alliance to Sithu.

It is through this marriage that Sithu the elder is remembered. The couple had two sons, Sithu Thanbawa and Thray Sithu. Through Sithu Thanbawa, his descendants included kings Mingyi Nyo, Tabinshwehti, and Nanda of the Toungoo dynasty.

Ancestry
The prince was descended from the Pagan royalty from both sides. His parents were half-siblings, children of King Kyawswa of Pagan.

Notes

References

Bibliography
 
 
 
 

Ava dynasty
1310s births